Modern Family is an American family sitcom television series created by Christopher Lloyd and Steven Levitan for the American Broadcasting Company (ABC). It ran for 11 seasons, from September 23, 2009, to April 8, 2020. It follows the lives of three diverse family set-ups in suburban Los Angeles, linked by patriarch Jay Pritchett.

Christopher Lloyd and Steven Levitan conceived the series while sharing stories of their own "modern families." Modern Family employs an ensemble cast and is presented in a mockumentary style, with the characters frequently speaking directly to the camera in confessional interview segments.

The series was renewed for an eleventh and final season on February 5, 2019, which premiered on September 25, 2019. The series finale aired on April 8, 2020.

Modern Family was highly acclaimed by critics throughout its first few seasons. Its critical reception became more mixed as it progressed, but it maintained a loyal fan base throughout its 11 seasons and was continuously popular. The final season received positive reviews, and the finale episode had 7.37 million first-run viewers. The retrospective documentary that aired before the final episode had 6.72 million first-run viewers.

The show was awarded the Emmy Award for Outstanding Comedy Series in each of its first five years and the Emmy Award for Outstanding Supporting Actor in a Comedy Series four times, twice each for Eric Stonestreet and Ty Burrell, as well as the Outstanding Supporting Actress in a Comedy Series twice for Julie Bowen. It won a total of 22 Emmy awards from 75 nominations. It also won the Golden Globe Award for Best Television Series – Musical or Comedy in 2011.

The broadcast syndication rights to the series were sold to NBCUniversal's USA Network, the stations of Fox Television Stations, and various other local stations in other markets for a fall 2013 premiere. The success of the series led to it being the 10th-highest revenue-generating show for 2012, earning $2.13 million an episode.

Premise
Modern Family revolves around three different types of families (nuclear, blended, and same-sex) living in the Los Angeles area, who are interrelated through wealthy business owner Jay Pritchett and his children, daughter Claire and son Mitchell.

Patriarch Jay remarried a much younger woman, Gloria Delgado Pritchett (née Ramirez), a passionate Colombian immigrant with whom he has a young son, Fulgencio Joseph "Joe" Pritchett (born in the middle of the fourth season), and a son from Gloria's previous marriage, Manuel "Manny" Delgado. Jay's ex-wife DeDe and Gloria's ex-husband Javier both make occasional appearances in the show.

Jay's daughter Claire was a homemaker who returned to the business world (at the start of the fifth season), eventually becoming the chief executive of her father's business, Pritchett's Closets and Blinds (in the middle of the seventh season). She is married to Phil Dunphy, a realtor and a self-professed "cool dad", who is also an amateur magician and real-estate lecturer at community college. They have three children: Haley, a stereotypically ditzy teenaged girl; Alex, an intelligent and nerdy middle child; and Luke, the offbeat only son. Haley's off again, on again boyfriend Dylan is a permanent fixture in the show, with the two eventually marrying at the end of the tenth season.

Jay's lawyer son Mitchell and his husband Cameron Tucker have one adopted daughter, Lily Tucker-Pritchett, of Vietnamese origin. At the series finale, they adopt another child, a baby boy named Rexford.

As the name suggests, this family represents a modern-day family, and episodes are comically based on situations that many families encounter in real life.

Cast and characters

Main characters
 Ed O'Neill as Jay Pritchett: Gloria's husband; Claire, Mitchell and Joe's father; Manny's stepfather; Haley, Alex, Luke and Lily's grandfather; Phil and Cameron's father-in-law.
 Sofía Vergara as Gloria Delgado-Pritchett: Jay's second wife; Manny and Joe's mother; Claire and Mitchell's stepmother.
 Julie Bowen as Claire Dunphy: Jay's daughter; Joe and Mitchell's sister; Phil's wife; Haley, Alex, and Luke's mother.
 Ty Burrell as Phil Dunphy: Claire's husband; Haley, Alex, and Luke's father.
 Jesse Tyler Ferguson as Mitchell Pritchett: Jay's son; Joe and Claire's brother; Cameron's husband; Lily and Rexford's adoptive father.
 Eric Stonestreet as Cameron Tucker: Mitchell's husband; Lily and Rexford's adoptive father.
 Sarah Hyland as Haley Dunphy: Claire and Phil's oldest daughter; Alex and Luke's sister; Dylan's wife; Poppy and George's mother.
 Ariel Winter as Alex Dunphy: Claire and Phil's youngest daughter; Haley and Luke's sister.
 Nolan Gould as Luke Dunphy: Claire and Phil's son; Haley and Alex's brother.
 Rico Rodriguez as Manny Delgado: Gloria and Javier's son; Joe's brother; Jay's stepson; Claire and Mitchell's stepbrother.
 Aubrey Anderson-Emmons as Lily Tucker-Pritchett: Mitchell and Cameron's adopted daughter who was born in Vietnam. (seasons 3–11)
 Portrayed by twins Jaden Hiller and Ella Hiller in seasons 1 and 2.
 Jeremy Maguire as Joe Pritchett: Gloria and Jay's son and Claire, Mitchell, and Manny's half brother (seasons 7–11)
 Portrayed by Rebecca and Sierra Mark in season 4 and Pierce Wallace in seasons 5 and 6.
 Reid Ewing as Dylan Marshall: Haley's on and off boyfriend, later husband; Poppy and George's father. (season 11; recurring seasons 1–5, 7 and 10; guest seasons 6 and 8-9)

Family tree
The characters in green have regular roles on the show. Dotted lines indicate a parental relationship through adoption or marriage, and dashed lines indicate a divorce between characters. † Indicates a deceased character.

The series has also had many recurring characters. Fred Willard has guest starred as Phil's father Frank; he was nominated for Outstanding Guest Actor in a Comedy Series at the 62nd Primetime Emmy Awards, but lost to Neil Patrick Harris's performance on Glee. Willard also received a posthumous nomination in the same category at the 72nd Primetime Creative Arts Emmy Awards in 2020. Shelley Long too guest starred occasionally as DeDe Pritchett, Jay's ex-wife and Claire and Mitchell's mother.

Nathan Lane appears as Cameron and Mitchell's flamboyant friend Pepper Saltzman; he has been nominated three times for the Primetime Emmy Award for Outstanding Guest Actor in a Comedy Series. Adam DeVine appeared as Andy Bailey, Jay and Gloria's "manny" (male nanny), Phil's assistant and Haley's ex-boyfriend. Elizabeth Banks appeared as Mitch and Cam's fun-loving friend Sal; she was nominated for Outstanding Guest Actress in a Comedy Series at the 67th Primetime Creative Arts Emmy Awards in 2015. Nathan Fillion also makes an appearance as Rainer Shine, a weather forcaster, and later Haley's boyfriend.

Development and production

Initial development

As creators Christopher Lloyd and Steven Levitan retold stories about their families, they realized that the stories could be the basis for a show. They started working on the idea of a family being observed in a mockumentary-style show. They later decided that it could be a show about three families and their experiences. It was originally called My American Family, and the camera crew was originally supposed to have been run by a fictitious Dutch filmmaker named Geert Floortje, who had lived as a teenaged exchange student with the Pritchetts and had developed a crush on Claire (while Mitchell had developed a crush on him). The producers later felt that this component was unnecessary, and it was scrapped. Lloyd now prefers to look at the show as "a family show done documentary-style".

Lloyd and Levitan pitched the series to CBS, NBC, and ABC (they did not pitch it to Fox because of issues they had with the network over a previous comedy series, Back to You, that Lloyd and Levitan also created and produced). CBS, which was not ready to make a big commitment to the single-camera style of filming, rejected the series. NBC, already broadcasting The Office and Parks and Recreation at the time, decided against taking on a third mockumentary-style show. ABC accepted the pitch.

The pilot episode tested positively with focus groups, resulting in the network ordering 13 episodes and adding it to the 2009–10 fall lineup days ahead of ABC's official schedule announcement. The series was given a full-season pickup in October 2009.

Filming
Principal photography took place in Los Angeles. Many of the exteriors used are on the city's Westside. The Dunphys' house is in the Cheviot Hills neighborhood. , Palisades Charter High School is used for the exteriors of Luke and Manny's school.

Lloyd and Levitan, whose credits both include Frasier, Wings, and Just Shoot Me, are executive producers of the series, serving as showrunner and head writer under their Lloyd-Levitan Productions label in affiliation with 20th Century Fox Television. The other original producers on the writing team were Paul Corrigan, Sameer Gardezi, Joe Lawson, Dan O'Shannon, Brad Walsh, Caroline Williams, Bill Wrubel, Danny Zuker, and Jeff Morton.

Starting with the second season, Levitan and Lloyd ran the show, not as a team, but separately, with each showrunner supervising half the episodes. "Chris and I are both strong, opinionated people, and we very, very quickly realized it doesn't make sense to sit here and debate each other and waste time," Levitan told The Hollywood Reporter in 2012. "We often come at it from different points of view, so we said, 'Let's just switch off who has final say.'"

Litigation

In the first season, the adult cast was paid a range of roughly $30,000 to $90,000 per episode. As a result of the show's success, the cast attempted to renegotiate their contracts in the summer of 2012 to obtain higher per-episode fees, but talks broke down to the point that the fourth season's first table read had to be postponed. Five of the cast members (Ty Burrell, Julie Bowen, Jesse Tyler Ferguson, Eric Stonestreet, and Sofía Vergara) retained the Quinn Emanuel law firm and sued 20th Century Fox Television in Los Angeles County Superior Court on July 24, 2012. While not part of the lawsuit, Ed O'Neill joined his fellow castmates in seeking raises for each to about $200,000 per episode; O'Neill had already been earning more money per episode than the other five. The lawsuit invoked the "seven-year rule" in California Labor Code Section 2855 (the De Havilland Law) and requested a declaration that their contracts were void because they were in violation of that rule. As of July 28, 2012, the conflict had been resolved. The five adult cast members' salaries were increased from $55,000–$65,000 per episode to $150,000–$175,000, with increases every season, plus a percentage of residual profits. O'Neill had already been earning $200,000 an episode, so his salary was lowered to parity with his co-stars, but with a larger percentage of the back-end profits. By that August, four of the five child stars negotiated increases from $15,000–$25,000 to $70,000 per episode, with an additional $10,000 per season raise.

Episodes

Themes
In The New York Times, Bruce Feiler called attention to how the show depicts the increasing way communications technology shapes the way people perceive others, even family members. "[It] is surely the first family comedy that incorporates its own hashtag of simultaneous self-analysis directly into the storyline," he writes. "Mark Zuckerberg may be a greater influence on Modern Family than Norman Lear."

The show's writers and actors agree. "We used to talk about how cellphones killed the sitcom because no one ever goes to anyone's house anymore" for routine information, Abraham Higginbotham told Feiler. "We embrace technology so it's part of the story." Ty Burrell draws on Fran Lebowitz's observation that there is no institution other than media. "I had this little flash of Phil—and me—that we are parsing our personality together externally from how people perceive us."

James Parker of The Atlantic commented, "How does one 'parent'? Who does what, which 'role'? Is Dad sufficiently dad-like and Mom enough of a mom?"

In a 2014 article in Slate, the site's podcast executive producer, Andy Bowers, a resident of Los Angeles' Westside, where the show films most of its exteriors, praised the series for its realistic depiction of life in that part of the city.

Reception

Ratings
Since its premiere, the series has remained popular. In its first season, the show became the sixth-highest rated scripted show in America and the third-highest rated new show. Aided by winning the Primetime Emmy Award for Outstanding Comedy Series, the show's second season became the highest rated show on Wednesday on premiere week and also rose 34% from the previous season among adults between the ages of 18 and 49. The show frequently ranked as television's top scripted series in adults 18–49 as well.

The success of the show has been positively compared to The Cosby Show. During the 2010–2011 season, Modern Family was the highest rated scripted show in the 18–49 demographic, and the third-highest rated overall sitcom behind CBS's The Big Bang Theory and Two and a Half Men. The season also ranked first among DVR viewers.

The third season premiere became ABC's top-rated season premiere in six years. The series' success in ratings has also led it to being credited for reviving sitcoms.

In 2016, a New York Times study of the 50 TV shows with the most Facebook likes found that Modern Familys "audience pattern is the prototypical example of a city show — most popular in liberal, urban clusters in Boston, San Francisco, and Santa Barbara, California, and least popular in the more rural parts of Kentucky, Mississippi, and Arkansas".

Each U.S. network television season starts in late September and ends in late May, which coincides with the completion of May sweeps.

{{Television season ratings
| link1             = Modern Family (season 1)
| timeslot1         = Wednesday 9:00 p.m.
| timeslot_length1  = 11
| episodes1         = 24
| start1            = 
| startrating1      = 12.61
| end1              = 
| endrating1        = 10.01
| season1           = 2009–10
| rank1             = 36
| viewers1          = 9.49
| 18_49_rank1       = 21
| 18_49_rating1     = 3.9

| link2             = Modern Family (season 2)
| episodes2         = 24
| start2            = 
| startrating2      = 12.61

Entertainment Weekly gave it an A−, calling it "immediately recognizable as the best new sitcom of the fall." In Times review, the show was named "the funniest new family comedy of the year." It has also been compared to the 1970s series Soap because of the multiple-family aspect. Some have made comparisons to The Office and Parks and Recreation because of their mockumentary formats. BuddyTV named the show the second best show in 2009, saying, "Every actor is fantastic, every family is interesting, and unlike many shows, there isn't a weak link." Robert Canning of IGN gave the season an 8.9 calling it "Great" and saying "Simply put, Modern Family was one of the best new comedies of the season." He also praised the ensemble cast and the characters, calling them lovable. According to Metacritic, the first season was the best reviewed new broadcast television series.

Modern Family drew criticism from the LGBT community for its portrayal of Cameron and Mitchell as not being physically affectionate with each other. The criticism spawned a Facebook campaign to demand that Mitchell and Cameron be allowed to kiss. In response to the controversy, producers released a statement that a season two episode would address Mitchell's discomfort with public displays of affection. Executive producer Levitan has said that it was unfortunate that the issue had arisen, since the show's writers had always planned on such a scene "as part of the natural development of the show." The episode "The Kiss" eventually aired with the kiss scene in the background, which drew praise from multiple critics.

Season 2
The show's second season received mostly positive reviews from critics. Season two has a rating of 88% on Rotten Tomatoes based on 16 reviews, with an average score of 8.11/10 and the consensus: "Modern Familys sophomore season sings with ingenious sitcom structure and an ensemble in perfect comedic harmony – even if the tunes are a little familiar". Robert Bianco of USA Today gave the second season four out of four stars, saying "Not since Frasier has a sitcom offered such an ideal blend of heart and smarts, or proven itself so effortlessly adept at so many comic variations, from subtle wordplay to big-laugh slapstick to everything in between." In a later review Bianco stated "as good as it was in its first year, is even better in its second", positively comparing the characters to the characters from The Mary Tyler Moore Show, The Cosby Show, and Friends. During the second season, Adweek named the show one of the 100 Most Influential TV Shows (98th chronologically). Despite this, some critics were less favorable toward the season and described it as a sophomore slump. Eric Stonestreet's acting was widely praised throughout the first season, but criticized during season two for being too contrived and "over-the-top"; Alan Sepinwall called Cameron Tucker a "whiny, overly-sensitive diva". On the other hand, the praise for Ty Burrell's performance (as Phil Dunphy) continued.

Season 3
The third season was met with critical acclaim. On Rotten Tomatoes, season three has a rating of 92% based on 13 reviews, with an average score of 8.33/10 and the consensus: "Modern Family settles into a well-oiled groove, consistently delivering inspired farce and making it look effortless." Slant Magazine reviewer Peter Swanson wrote that while the first episode was "the type of wacky-location stunt that's usually reserved for the fifth or sixth season of a dying sitcom," the following episodes "have been better... but they're still uneven". He also criticized the writers for relying too much on "stunt episodes and celebrity cameos, like David Cross". He ultimately gave the season 3 out of 4 stars. James Parker of The Atlantic said, at the beginning of the third season that "Modern Family is very, very funny, almost ruthlessly so. It's a bit of a master class in pace and brevity. The writing is Vorsprung durch Technik: hectically compressed but dramatically elegant, prodigal in its zingers and snorters but austere in its construction." He found it an exception to his dislike for sitcoms that do not use a laugh track. During the third season, New York Times columnist Frank Bruni argued that gay criticism of Cameron and Mitchell actually showed the progress gays have made toward social acceptance. "A decade ago," he writes, "[gays] would have balked—and balked loudly—at how frequently Cameron in particular tips into limp-wristed, high-voiced caricature." But now, "most gay people trust that the television audience knows we're a diverse tribe, not easily pigeonholed. Modern Family endows us with a sort of comic banality. It's an odd kind of progress. But it's progress nonetheless."

Season 4
The fourth season of Modern Family received mixed-to-positive reviews from critics. Rotten Tomatoes currently gives the season an approval rating of 73% based on 11 reviews, with an average score of 7.75/10 and the consensus: "Modern Family still has charm to burn and boasts a uniformly excellent cast, but the series' subversive edge has dulled". Halfway through the season, Rachel Stein of Television Without Pity wrote, "much as I liked the pairings and some of the dialogue, ["New Year's Eve"] is just another contrived episode of Modern Family we can cite when we talk later about how a different show should have won the 2013 Emmy for Best Comedy." Dalene Rovenstein of Paste Magazine gave the season a positive review, but said a better season was possible.

Season 5
The fifth season of Modern Family also received positive reviews. On Rotten Tomatoes, season five has a rating of 90% based on 10 reviews, with an average score of 7.57/10 and the consensus: "Modern Family returns to its conventional roots with grace in a fifth season that delights in providing reliable laughs and rekindles the show's trademark warmth". Reviewing the season's first eight episodes, Matthew Wolfson of Slant Magazine wrote that the show "appear[ed] to have finally arrived at the depressing and predictable low point toward which it [had] been trending for the past two years." He also went on to say that the show had "turned into a shrill pastiche of stereotypical characterizations and superficial banter lacking both feeling and wit", assigning it a rating of 1.5/4 stars. Different writers for The A.V. Club rated, in total, a majority of the former-half episodes with a "B−" grade or less. One writer for the magazine, Joshua Alston, gave "ClosetCon '13" a "C+" and remarked that "Modern Family becomes a high-wire act when it separates its characters into three storylines with no overlap between them." The second half was more warmly received, with three episodes rated an "A−" or higher.

Season 6
The show's sixth season received highly positive reviews from TV critics, with some claiming that it was an improvement over the last few seasons. This season has a rating of 100% on Rotten Tomatoes based on 7 reviews, with an average score of 7.67/10. Joshua Alston and Gwen Ihnat The A.V. Club have awarded the majority of episodes a "B" grade or higher – with particular praise for "The Day We Almost Died" and "Closet? You'll Love It!" – marking an improvement over the repeated "C" grade given throughout the previous season's former half. "Connection Lost" received high critical acclaim, with many praising the episode's writing, originality and "success in transcending what could have been a gimicky episode". In her review for "Closet? You'll Love It!" Gwen Ihnat of The A.V. Club stated that the episode represents "all the reasons why we still watch Modern Family" and awarded the episode an A−. On the same site, David Kallison reviewed "Grill, Interrupted", saying: "This season proves that sitcoms can survive on solid characters and solid jokes."

Season 7
The seventh season received mixed-to-positive reviews from critics with many critics calling it similar to the fourth and fifth seasons. On Rotten Tomatoes, this season is rated 67% with 6 reviews and an average rating of 6.5/10. Kyle Fowle from The A.V. Club had a very mixed reaction to the season, only giving one episode an A− or higher. Fowle felt the season was frustrating, believing the season would be defined "by its lack of character progress and overstuffed episodes."

Later seasons
The series was renewed for a 9th and 10th season on May 10, 2017, Season 9 premiered on September 27, 2017, while season 10 premiered on September 26, 2018,

Seasons 8 and 9 received mixed-to-positive reviews from critics, with main criticisms directed at the lack of character development, overstuffing of episodes, and too many filler episodes per season. While the show continued to be praised for its charm, witty writing, and the cast's performances, criticism grew in these seasons, particularly from reviewers such as those at The A.V. Club.

In January 2018, Steve Levitan and Christopher Lloyd announced that season 10 would most likely be the final season, during the Television Critics Association's winter press tour. However, in August 2018, reports indicated that ABC was in discussions to renew the series for a potential eleventh season.

Season 10 received positive reviews from critics, citing the season as a significant improvement over the last two. The series was praised for its tackling of Haley's pregnancy, the humor of Mitch and Cam looking after Cal, and its dealing with change in a positive way. Episodes 'Torn Between Two Lovers', 'Good Grief, and 'A Year Of Birthdays' were particularly praised.

The series was renewed for an eleventh season on January 7, 2019, which was confirmed as the final season on February 5. The last season premiered on September 25, 2019, and aired its last episode on April 8, 2020.

Season 11 similarly received positive reviews. The season was praised for its themes of change and ending, and the improved humor upon the last seasons, with particular attention to episodes 'The Prescott', 'Legacy,' 'Spuds' and 'Finale'.

Modern Family final episode, Finale, aired April 8, 2020, and received a B+ grade from Kyle Fowle of The A.V. Club, citing 'there's something that's satisfying in just how low-key it is. The finale doesn't necessarily shoot for outsized emotions. Instead, it makes things personal. It's a finale that suits Modern Family as it is in 2020, a show that's settled into old age. This is a finale that's both tidy and unfinished, and that feels just right'. The episode was praised by critics and fans alike, particularly for the humor in Claire and Mitchell's ice skating scene, Mitchell and Cam's karaoke scene, and The Dunphy children's final joke on Luke, with TV Fanatic saying, 'one of the highlights of the episode were the scenes between Haley, Alex, and Luke.' Critics also praised Gloria finally letting Manny go, describing the scene as bringing the two characters' arcs full circle. The episode's message of 'leaving a porch light on' was also praised, with fans and critics expressing this ending note's highly emotional nature.

Accolades

Modern Family has won 22 Primetime Emmy Awards and 6 Writers Guild of America Awards. The show also later received a GLSEN Respect Award for its portrayal of "positive images and storylines that reflect a diverse America, including the depiction of a family headed by a gay couple." In 2010, Modern Family was nominated for five Television Critics Association Awards.  To reinforce the idea of an ensemble cast, the cast all submitted themselves in the Supporting Actor and Actress categories instead of Lead Actor and Actress for the 62nd Primetime Emmy Awards. The series has also been put on multiple critics' lists. In 2010, the series was listed 2nd on Time's Top Ten Best Shows of 2009, 2nd on BuddyTV's Top Ten Best Shows of 2009, Jason Hughes Best TV of 2009, Modern Family was awarded a Peabody Award in 2009. In 2012, the show won the Golden Globe Award for Best Television Series – Musical or Comedy and was nominated for a British Academy Television Award. Every season of the show was also named one of the top 10 TV seasons of the year (from 2009 to 2012) by the American Film Institute.

During the 2012 US presidential election, both First Lady Michelle Obama, in an interview with Kal Penn at the 2012 Democratic National Convention, and Ann Romney, in an interview with The Insider, cited Modern Family as their favorite TV show.

In June 2013, the Writers Guild of America ranked Modern Family number 34 on a list of the 101 most well-written television series ever made. In December 2013, TV Guide ranked it number 43 on its list of the 60 Best Series of all time.

Emmy Awards received by cast
The following is a list of Emmy nominations received by the cast of the series. Wins are highlighted in boldface.
 Ed O'Neill earned three consecutive nominations for Outstanding Supporting Actor in a Comedy Series in 2011, 2012 and 2013.
 Sofía Vergara earned four consecutive nominations for Outstanding Supporting Actress in a Comedy Series in 2010, 2011, 2012 and 2013.
 Julie Bowen earned six consecutive nominations for Outstanding Supporting Actress in a Comedy Series in 2010, 2011, 2012, 2013, 2014 and 2015.
 Ty Burrell, the most nominated actor in the series, received eight consecutive nominations for Outstanding Supporting Actor in a Comedy Series in 2010, 2011, 2012, 2013, 2014, 2015, 2016 and 2017.
 Jesse Tyler Ferguson received five consecutive nominations for Outstanding Supporting Actor in a Comedy Series in 2010, 2011, 2012, 2013 and 2014.
 Eric Stonestreet received three consecutive nominations for Outstanding Supporting Actor in a Comedy Series in 2010, 2011 and 2012.
 Nathan Lane received three nominations for Outstanding Guest Actor in a Comedy Series in 2011, 2013 and 2014.
 Fred Willard received two nominations for Outstanding Guest Actor in a Comedy Series in 2011 and 2020.
 Greg Kinnear was nominated for Outstanding Guest Actor in a Comedy Series in 2012.
 Elizabeth Banks was nominated for Outstanding Guest Actress in a Comedy Series in 2015.

Criticism
Michelle Haimoff of the Christian Science Monitor criticized the show for only casting the women as stay-at-home moms while the husbands have highly successful careers: "There is a difference between quirky, flawed characters and ones who are incapable of professional success. And when the latter is reliably female, it makes for sexist television. It also makes for unrealistic television." Late Night with Jimmy Fallon writer Ali Waller asked her Twitter followers "If Modern Family is so 'modern' then why don't any of the women have jobs?" Other authors reinforce this criticism, claiming that stay-at-home mothers are no longer the norm in today's society.

According to a CNET staffer commenting on a first-season episode: "The wife and daughter are unable to learn how to use the remote and must be taught by the father, while the son is 'good with electronics,' even though he is thought of as the stupidest member of the family." Arianna Reiche from Gawker commented on the episode "Game Changer" in which Gloria hides her skill at chess so her husband will not be upset at losing: "This moment is at best a sappy quip about compromise in an often heavy-handed series, and at worst, it's a moment in a show with 9.3 million viewers, on a network owned by Disney, which explicitly validates girls and women subduing their intellect."

The show eventually focused more on Claire's career progress, with her running for city council, and flipping a home. In season 4 of the show, she reveals that she has been trying to find work now that her three children no longer need a stay-at-home mother, but that she found it difficult to reenter the job market after such a long hiatus, even with a college degree. In season 5, Claire returns to work a job at her father Jay Pritchett's closet company.

Syndication, streaming, and international broadcast
The series was picked up for syndication by USA Network for $1.5 million per episode, along with being offered in local syndication at the same time, with Fox Television Stations the lead station group picking up the series. The series is also shown on Sky Comedy in the United Kingdom, e.tv in South Africa, Fox in Sweden, yes Comedy in Israel and Star World in India. In Canada, the series aired on Citytv for its first ten seasons. The network additionally obtained the syndicated strip-rights to the series when they became available. Subsequently, the series moved to  Global for its eleventh and final season.

The series was made available for streaming on Hulu and Peacock in its entirety on February 3, 2021.

Adaptations
 Chile: MEGA was the first in the world to buy the rights of Modern Family to produce their own version of the series, with the title Familia moderna, which premiered on December 3, 2015. One difference in this is Mitchell and Cameron's counterparts in this version do not adopt, but instead one of them is the biological father of the child as a result of a drunken fling. They take custody of the child while the mother travels overseas.
 Greece: Mega Channel bought the rights of Modern Family for Greece and Cyprus and announced a Greek language adaptation, under the name Moderna Oikogeneia, which premiered on March 20, 2014.
 Iran: The Islamic Republic of Iran Broadcasting produced a scene-by-scene remake of Modern Family, titled Haft Sang which premiered on June 30, 2014. However, in this version the same-sex relationship between Cam and Mitchell of the original series was replaced by a heterosexual relationship. Also, Haley Dunphy's character is replaced by a teenage boy. Due to this change, Haley's boyfriend Dylan is replaced by a close friend of the teenage boy.

Potential spinoff
In June 2020, ABC Entertainment president Karey Burke discussed a spin-off of Modern Family centered around Mitch and Cam, inspired by an idea from series co-creator and executive producer, Steven Levitan. In June 2022, star Jesse Tyler Ferguson confirmed that the script for the show's spinoff is completed. "The script's out there and it's very good," he told. "So you know, who knows? If someone wants to produce it, maybe."

References

External links
  at ABC.com
 
 
 

 
2000s American LGBT-related comedy television series
2000s American mockumentary television series
2000s American single-camera sitcoms
2009 American television series debuts
2010s American LGBT-related comedy television series
2010s American mockumentary television series
2010s American single-camera sitcoms
2020 American television series endings
2020s American LGBT-related comedy television series
2020s American mockumentary television series
2020s American single-camera sitcoms
American Broadcasting Company original programming
American LGBT-related sitcoms
Best Musical or Comedy Series Golden Globe winners
English-language television shows
Outstanding Performance by an Ensemble in a Comedy Series Screen Actors Guild Award winners
Peabody Award-winning television programs
Primetime Emmy Award for Outstanding Comedy Series winners
Primetime Emmy Award-winning television series
Television series about families
Television series about marriage
Television series about television
Television series by Steven Levitan Productions
Television series by 20th Century Fox Television
Television shows featuring audio description
Television shows filmed in Los Angeles
Television shows set in Los Angeles
Non-American television series based on American television series
Television shows remade overseas